TreeHugger  is a sustainability website that reports on news, and other subjects like eco-friendly design, homes, and gardens. It was rated the top sustainability blog of 2007 by Nielsen Netratings,
and was included in Time Magazine's 2009 blog index as one of the top twenty-five blogs. The website boasts "over 100 expert writers." All submissions are reviewed by the website's staff for accuracy and compliance with their editorial guidelines.

History
TreeHugger was acquired by Discovery Communications on August 1, 2007, for $10 million.

In 2012, Mother Nature Network, founded by Joel Babbit and Chuck Leavell (now Narrative Content Group) acquired TreeHugger.

In 2020, Dotdash acquired TreeHugger and Mother Nature Network.

TreeHuggers has an annual award program known as "Best of Green Awards" for the best green initiatives within various sectors and categories.

See also

 Conservation movement
 Ecology movement
 Environmentalism

References

External links
 TreeHugger
 Video interview with Graham Hill, founder of TreeHugger
 Video of Graham Hill at PSFK Conference NYC: When Ideas Create Good
 Walk the Talk Show with Waylon Lewis Interview with founder Graham Hill

American environmental websites
Internet properties established in 2005